The Western New Mexico Mustangs are the athletic teams that represent Western New Mexico University, located in Silver City, New Mexico, in NCAA Division II intercollegiate sports. The Mustangs are members of the Lone Star Conference after previously being members of the Rocky Mountain Athletic Conference.

Varsity sports

Teams

Men's sports
 Basketball
 Cross Country
 Football
 Golf
 Tennis
 Track & Field

Women's sports
 Basketball
 Cross Country
 Golf
 Softball
 Tennis
 Track & Field
 Volleyball

Golf
The WNMU Ladies Golf Team led the Rocky Mountain Athletic Conference (RMAC) in the 2007–2008 season. Senior Tina Bickford was named RMAC Player of the Year and the team finished the year as the regular season and tournament champions. In 2013, the Ladies were repeat champions.

Tennis
The men's tennis team has been the RMAC Champions each year since 2009. In 2013, the Lady Mustang tennis teams earned RMAC Champion honors.

References

External links
 

 
College sports teams in New Mexico